Vraclav is a municipality and village in Ústí nad Orlicí District in the Pardubice Region of the Czech Republic. It has about 800 inhabitants.

Administrative parts
Villages of Sedlec and Svatý Mikuláš are administrative parts of Vraclav.

Geography
It lies in the Svitavy Uplands.

History
A gord was established here in the mid-11th century. The first written mention of Vraclav is from 1073.

Sights

The main sight is the Baroque complex of the former pilgrimage Church of Saint Nicholas. In 1711, a spa was established here, near a spring of water that was considered curative. A local chapel was replaced by the church in 1724–1726. The spa and the pilgrimage site almost disappeared in the first half of the 19th century. The complex was reconstructed in 1976–1986. In the former church there is an exposition administered by Vysoké Mýto Regional Museum.

Notable people
Jiří Paďour (1943–2015), Roman Catholic bishop

References

External links

  

Villages in Ústí nad Orlicí District